Joseph Timothy Parker (born 23 August 1976) is a former English cricketer who played five first-class matches for Oxford University in 1998. In all his five innings, he was dismissed for between 11 and 19.

References

External links
 

1976 births
Living people
English cricketers
Oxford University cricketers
Alumni of St John's College, Oxford